Yelyzaveta "Liza" Mereshko (born 8 July 1992) is a Ukrainian Paralympic swimmer. In 2015, she set the world record for the S6 100m freestyle event.

Mereshko took silver in the SM6 200m Individual Medley at the 2019 World Para Swimming Championships in London. She was beaten by Maisie Summers-Newton who created a new world record for the Medley when she beat Mereshko. The record had been set earlier that year by Summers-Newton in Glasgow.

References

External links 
 

1992 births
Living people
Ukrainian female freestyle swimmers
Paralympic swimmers of Ukraine
S6-classified Paralympic swimmers
Medalists at the World Para Swimming Championships
Medalists at the World Para Swimming European Championships
Sportspeople from Kherson
Paralympic medalists in swimming
Paralympic gold medalists for Ukraine
Paralympic silver medalists for Ukraine
Paralympic bronze medalists for Ukraine
Medalists at the 2016 Summer Paralympics
Swimmers at the 2016 Summer Paralympics
Swimmers at the 2020 Summer Paralympics
Medalists at the 2020 Summer Paralympics
Ukrainian female medley swimmers
21st-century Ukrainian women